This is a list of gentlemen's clubs in Sri Lanka, including those no longer functioning and from the further regions of British ruled Sri Lanka and those formed after British ruled.

Gentlemen's Clubs

See also 
 Gymkhana
 List of American gentlemen's clubs
 List of London's gentlemen's clubs

External links  
 Seth Alexander Thévoz, Global Clubs Directory

Clubs and societies in Sri Lanka
Sri Lanka
Gentlemen's clubs in Sri Lanka
Gentlemen's clubs